Inderbir Singh "Ish" Sodhi (born 31 October 1992) is a New Zealand cricketer born in Punjab, India who represents the New Zealand national cricket team in all formats, and Canterbury in domestic cricket. He bowls right-arm leg spin, and bats right-handed. He reached the no.1 ranking for T20I bowlers in January 2018, jumping from no. 10 at the end of the previous year.

Early life
Sodhi is ethnic Punjabi and was born in Ludhiana, India to a Sikh family. He moved to Papatoetoe, New Zealand with his family when he was four years old. He attended Papatoetoe High School.

Domestic and T20 career
Sodhi made his debut for Northern Districts in the 2012–13 Plunket Shield season.

In 2017, Sodhi was not named in the Test squad against Bangladesh, which enabled him to play for Adelaide Strikers as an injury replacement for Chris Jordan. On 18 January in his third game for the Strikers, he ended the match with figures of 6/11 off 3.3 overs to win the match for the Strikers and Man of the Match. These are the second-best figures in Big Bash history after Lasith Malinga's 6/7 from 4 overs between the Melbourne Stars and Perth Scorchers.

He was the leading wicket-taker in the 2018–19 Plunket Shield season, with 36 dismissals in seven matches. He was released by the Rajasthan Royals ahead of the 2020 IPL auction. In July 2020, he was named in the St Kitts & Nevis Patriots squad for the 2020 Caribbean Premier League.

International career
His international debut for New Zealand came in a Test match against Bangladesh during New Zealand's 2013 tour of Bangladesh. He made his Twenty20 International debut against the West Indies in July 2014. In November 2014 Sodhi was selected for a three-test series against Pakistan cricket team. In the first Test, he scored 63, a personal best and the best score by a New Zealand number-ten batsman in Test cricket. Sodhi made his One Day International debut for New Zealand against Zimbabwe on 2 August 2015.

In May 2018, he was one of twenty players to be awarded a new contract for the 2018–19 season by New Zealand Cricket. In April 2019, he was named in New Zealand's squad for the 2019 Cricket World Cup. In August 2021, Sodhi was named in New Zealand's squad for the 2021 ICC Men's T20 World Cup.

In December 2022, Sodhi was recalled in New Zealand's Test squad after 4 years, for their tour to Pakistan. In the first Test, he picked up his maiden five-wicket haul in Test cricket, besides scoring his career best 65 runs in the first innings.

References

External links

1992 births
Living people
Indian emigrants to New Zealand
New Zealand people of Punjabi descent
New Zealand sportspeople of Indian descent
New Zealand cricketers
New Zealand Test cricketers
New Zealand One Day International cricketers
New Zealand Twenty20 International cricketers
Cricketers at the 2019 Cricket World Cup
Northern Districts cricketers
North Island cricketers
Adelaide Strikers cricketers
Nottinghamshire cricketers
Rajasthan Royals cricketers
Jamaica Tallawahs cricketers
St Kitts and Nevis Patriots cricketers
Worcestershire cricketers
People educated at Papatoetoe High School
Colombo Stars cricketers
Welsh Fire cricketers